The 1999 Elite League speedway season was the 65th season of the top tier of speedway in the United Kingdom. It was the third known as the Elite League and was governed by the Speedway Control Board (SCB), in conjunction with the British Speedway Promoters' Association (BSPA).

Season summary
In 2000, the league increased to ten teams with the Hull Vikings and the Peterborough Panthers moving up from the Premier League, and the Swindon Robins dropping down. The league operated on a standard format without play-offs.

Despite coming up a division Peterbrough completely rebuilt their team for the season. They brought in three Australians Jason Crump from Oxford Cheetahs, Ryan Sullivan from Poole Pirates and Craig Watson from Newport Wasps, in addition to recalling Zdeněk Tesař. Poole ran Peterborough close, only losing the league by one point and losing in the cup final to them.

Final table

Elite League Knockout Cup
The 1999 Speedway Star Knockout Cup was the 61st edition of the Knockout Cup for tier one teams. Peterborough Panthers were the winners of the competition.

First round

Second round

Semi-finals

Final
The second leg of the final was due to be completed on 22 October but was abandoned after just two heats due to heavy rain.

First leg

Second leg

Peterborough Panthers were declared Knockout Cup Champions, winning on aggregate 92-88.

Leading averages

Riders & final averages
Belle Vue

 8.66
 8.27
	8.27
 8.00
 7.28
 3.25
 2.80
 2.67
 2.33
 2.00
 1.60
 1.00

Coventry

 9.31
 8.91
 8.00
 7.67
 6.47
 5.91
 5.62
 5.43
 5.33
 3.01

Eastbourne

 7.81
 7.56
 7.09
 7.03
 6.41
 6.07
 5.60
 2.45
 1.40

Hull

 8.76
 8.60
 6.36
 5.86
 5.60
 5.52
 5.35
 4.67
 3.80
 1.66

Ipswich

 9.24 
 8.96 
 7.30
 6.33
 6.33
 4.99
 4.82
 3.35

King's Lynn

 9.64
 9.47
 7.56
 7.22
 6.78
 4.85
 4.45
 3.79
 3.21
2.18

Oxford

 8.18 
 7.23
 6.99
 6.74
 6.51
 5.40
 5.08

Peterborough

 10.67
 9.05
 7.12
 5.97
 5.83
 5.53
 5.47

Poole

 9.80 
 8.64
 8.42 
 7.41
 6.59
 6.20
 2.29
 1.81

Wolverhampton

 8.27
 8.08
 7.64
 6.98
 6.65
 5.96
 5.12
 4.73
 2.10

See also
 Speedway in the United Kingdom
 List of United Kingdom Speedway League Champions
 Knockout Cup (speedway)

References

SGB Premiership
1999 in British motorsport